Viviers-lès-Lavaur (literally Viviers near Lavaur) is a commune in the Tarn department in southern France.

See also
Communes of the Tarn department

References

Communes of Tarn (department)